The Russet Stakes was an American Thoroughbred horse race on turf held annually from 1895 through 1909 at Sheepshead Bay Race Track in Sheepshead Bay, Brooklyn, New York. Open to horses age three and older and run at a distance of 1½ miles, it was an event that attracted mainly stayers who were best at longer distances.

Historical notes
On June 10, 1886 the Coney Island Jockey Club opened the first turf racecourse in the United States. In 1895, the inaugural running of the Russet Stakes was won by Montana Copper King Marcus Daly's British-born import Bathampton. The four-year-old horse was ridden by future U. S. Racing Hall of Fame inductee Fred Taral and trained by another future U. S. Racing Hall of Fame inductee, Matthew Byrnes. The final running on September 9, 1909 was won by Bonnie Kelso, a $140 yearling purchase who set a new course record. Bonnie Kelso's owner/trainer and future Hall of Fame inductee George Odom had won the 1904 Russet as a jockey aboard Goughacre Stable's Shorthose.

The end of a race and of a racetrack
On June 11, 1908, the Republican controlled New York Legislature under Governor Charles Evans Hughes passed the Hart–Agnew anti-betting legislation. The owners of Sheepshead Bay Race Track, and other racing facilities in New York State, struggled to stay in business without income from betting. Racetrack operators had no choice but to drastically reduce the purse money being paid out which resulted in the Russet Stakes offering a purse in 1909 that was less than one-third of what it had been in earlier years. These small purses made horse racing unprofitable and impossible for even the most successful horse owners to continue in business. As such, for the 1910 racing season management of the Sheepshead Bay facility dropped some of its minor stakes races and used the purse money to bolster its most important events. Further restrictive legislation was passed by the New York Legislature in 1910 which resulted in the deepening of the financial crisis for track operators and led to a complete shut down of racing across the state during 1911 and 1912. When a Court ruling saw racing return in 1913 it was too late for the Sheepshead Bay facility and it never reopened.

Records
Speed record:
 2:32.40 – Bonnie Kelso (1909)

Most wins:
 no horse won this race more than once

Most wins by a jockey:
 2 – Tod Sloan (1897, 1898)
 2 – Winfield O'Connor (1899, 1901)

Most wins by a trainer:
 no trainer won this race more than once

Most wins by an owner:
 no owner won this race more than once

Winners

References

Discontinued horse races in New York City
Turf races in the United States
Open middle distance horse races
Sheepshead Bay Race Track
Recurring sporting events established in 1895
Recurring sporting events disestablished in 1909
1895 establishments in New York City
1909 disestablishments in New York (state)
Sports in Brooklyn